Thuès-Carança station (French: Gare de Thuès-Carança) is a railway station in Thuès-Entre-Valls, Occitanie, southern France. Within TER Occitanie, it is part of line 32 (Latour-de-Carol-Enveitg–Villefranche-Vernet-les-Bains, Train Jaune).

References

Railway stations in Pyrénées-Orientales